Debra Pepler  is a Canadian psychologist known for her research and advocacy within the field of childhood aggression and bullying. She is currently a distinguished research professor at York University in Toronto, Ontario.

Career 
Pepler completed a Bachelor of Arts degree at Queen's University in 1973, followed by a Master of Science degree at Dalhousie University in 1976. In 1979, she was awarded her PhD from the University of Waterloo. She has been a faculty member in the Department of Psychology at York University since 1988 and a senior associate scientist at the Hospital for Sick Children in Toronto since 2001. 

Pepler is a nationally recognized expert in the field of childhood aggression, including bullying. She has co-edited 12 books and published over 200 refereed journal articles, book chapters, and white papers. In one major project, Pepler and colleagues recorded and analyzed video footage of children's interactions on the playground and in the classroom, observing their bullying experiences, targets' coping styles, and peers' responses.

In 1997, she appeared on an episode of the Oprah Winfrey Show to discuss her work on bullying.

In 2006, Pepler co-founded (with Wendy Craig, her first PhD student) Promoting Relationships and Eliminating Violence Network (PREVNet), a collaboration between researchers and community organizations dedicated to preventing childhood bullying and violence. 

In 2015, Pepler was awarded the Donald O. Hebb Award for Distinguished Contributions to Psychology as a Science, by the Canadian Psychological Association. In 2019, she was named an Officer of the Order of Canada.

Selected works

References

Year of birth missing (living people)
Living people
Academic staff of York University
Canadian psychologists
University of Waterloo alumni
Dalhousie University alumni
Queen's University at Kingston alumni
Officers of the Order of Canada
Canadian women psychologists